The GeForce 700 series (stylized as GEFORCE GTX 700 SERIES) is a series of graphics processing units developed by Nvidia. While mainly a refresh of the Kepler microarchitecture (GK-codenamed chips), some cards use Fermi (GF) and later cards use Maxwell (GM). GeForce 700 series cards were first released in 2013, starting with the release of the GeForce GTX Titan on February 19, 2013, followed by the GeForce GTX 780 on May 23, 2013. The first mobile GeForce 700 series chips were released in April 2013.

Overview 
GK110 was designed and marketed with computational performance in mind. It contains 7.1 billion transistors. This model also attempts to maximise energy efficiency through the execution of as many tasks as possible in parallel according to the capabilities of its streaming processors.

With GK110, increases in memory space and bandwidth for both the register file and the L2 cache over previous models, are seen. At the SMX level, GK110's register file space has increased to 256KB composed of 64K 32bit registers, as compared to Fermi's 32K 32bit registers totaling 128 KB. As for the L2 cache, GK110 L2 cache space increased by up to 1.5MB, 2x as big as GF110. Both the L2 cache and register file bandwidth have also doubled.
Performance in register-starved scenarios is also improved as there are more registers available to each thread. This goes in hand with an increase of total number of registers each thread can address, moving from 63 registers per thread to 255 registers per thread with GK110.

With GK110, Nvidia also reworked the GPU texture cache to be used for compute. With 48KB in size, in compute the texture cache becomes a read-only cache, specializing in unaligned memory access workloads. Furthermore, error detection capabilities have been added to make it safer for use with workloads that rely on ECC.

The series also supports DirectX 12 on Windows 10.

Dynamic Super Resolution  (DSR) was added to Kepler GPUs with the latest Nvidia drivers.

Architecture 

The GeForce 700 series contains features from both GK104 and GK110. Kepler based members of the 700 series add the following standard features to the GeForce family.

Derived from GK104:

 PCI Express 3.0 interface
 DisplayPort 1.2
 HDMI 1.4a 4K x 2K video output
 Purevideo VP5 hardware video acceleration (up to 4K x 2K H.264 decode)
 Hardware H.264 encoding acceleration block (NVENC)
 Support for up to 4 independent 2D displays, or 3 stereoscopic/3D displays (NV Surround)
 Bindless Textures
 GPU Boost
 TXAA
 Manufactured by TSMC on a 28 nm process

New Features from GK110:

 Compute Focus SMX Improvement 
 CUDA Compute Capability 3.5 
 New Shuffle Instructions 
 Dynamic Parallelism 
 Hyper-Q (Hyper-Q's MPI functionality reserve for Tesla only)
 Grid Management Unit 
 NVIDIA GPUDirect (GPU Direct's RDMA functionality reserve for Tesla & Quadro only)
 GPU-Boost 2.0

Compute focus SMX improvement 
With GK110, Nvidia opted to increase compute performance. The single biggest change from GK104 is that rather than 8 dedicated FP64 CUDA cores, GK110 has up to 64, giving it 8x the FP64 throughput of a GK104 SMX. The SMX also sees an increase in space for register file. Register file space has increased to 256KB compared to Fermi. The texture cache are also improved. With a 48KB space, the texture cache can become a read-only cache for compute workloads.

New shuffle Instructions 
At a low level, GK110 sees additional  instructions and operations to further improve performance. New shuffle instructions allow for threads within a warp to share data without going back to memory, making the process much quicker than the previous load/share/store method. Atomic operations are also overhauled, speeding up the execution speed of atomic operations and adding some FP64 operations that were previously only available for FP32 data.

NVENC

Hyper-Q 
Hyper-Q expands GK110 hardware work queues from 1 to 32. The significance of this being that having a single work queue meant that Fermi could be under occupied at times as there wasn't enough work in that queue to fill every SM. By having 32 work queues, GK110 can in many scenarios, achieve higher utilization by being able to put different task streams on what would otherwise be an idle SMX. The simple nature of Hyper-Q is further reinforced by the fact that it's easily map to MPI, a common message passing interface frequently used in HPC. As legacy MPI-based algorithms that were originally designed for multi-CPU systems that became bottlenecked by false dependencies now have a solution. By increasing the number of MPI jobs, it's possible to utilize Hyper-Q on these algorithms to improve the efficiency all without changing the code itself.

Microsoft DirectX support 
Nvidia Kepler GPUs of the GeForce 700 series fully support DirectX 11.0.

Nvidia supports the DX12 API on all the DX11-class GPUs it has shipped; these belong to the Fermi, Kepler and Maxwell architectural families.

Dynamic parallelism 
Dynamic parallelism ability is for kernels to be able to dispatch other kernels. With Fermi, only the CPU could dispatch a kernel, which incurs a certain amount of overhead by having to communicate back to the CPU. By giving kernels the ability to dispatch their own child kernels, GK110 can both save time by not having to go back to the CPU, and in the process free up the CPU to work on other tasks.

Products

GeForce 700 (7xx) series

The GeForce 700 series for desktop architecture. Cheaper and lower performing products were expected to be released over time. Kepler supports 11.1 features with 11_0 feature level through the DirectX 11.1 API, however Nvidia did not enable four non-gaming features in Hardware in Kepler (for 11_1).

 1 Shader Processors : Texture mapping units : Render output units
 2 Pixel fillrate is calculated as the number of ROPs multiplied by the base core clock speed
 3 Texture fillrate is calculated as the number of TMUs multiplied by the base core clock speed.
 4 Single precision performance is calculated as 2 times the number of shaders multiplied by the base core clock speed.
 5 Double precision performance of the GTX Titan and GTX Titan Black is either 1/3 or 1/24 of single-precision performance depending on a user-selected configuration option in the driver that boosts single-precision performance if double-precision is set to 1/24 of single-precision performance, while other Kepler chips' double precision performance is fixed at 1/24 of single-precision performance. GeForce 700 series Maxwell chips' double precision performance is 1/32 of single-precision performance.
 6 SLI supports connecting up to 4 identical graphics cards for a 4-way SLI configuration. Those supporting 4-way SLI can support 3-way & 2-way SLI, however a dual-GPU card already implements 2-way SLI internally, thus only 2 dual-GPU cards can be used in SLI to give a 4-way SLI configuration.

GeForce 700M (7xxM) series
Some implementations may use different specifications.

 1 Unified shaders : Texture mapping units : Render output units

Chipset table

GeForce 700 (7xx) series

Discontinued support 
Nvidia announced that after Release 390.x drivers, it will no longer release 32-bit drivers for 32-bit operating systems.

Nvidia announced that Kepler notebook GPUs will transition to legacy support from April 2019 onwards and be supported until April 2020. All notebook GPUs from the 7xxM family are affected by this change.

Nvidia announced that after Release 470 drivers, it would transition driver support for the Windows 7 and Windows 8.1 operating systems to legacy status and continue to provide critical security updates for these operating systems through September 2024.

Nvidia announced that all remaining Kepler desktop GPUs would transition to legacy support from September 2021 onwards and be supported for critical security updates through September 2024. The Nvidia GeForce GTX 745, 750 and 750 Ti from the 7xx desktop GPU family would not be affected by this change.

In Windows the last driver to fully support CUDA with 64-Bit Compute Capability 3.5 for Kepler in Windows 7 & Windows 8.1 64-bit is 388.71,
tested with latest CUDA-Z and GPU-Z, after that driver, the 64-Bit CUDA support becomes broken for GeForce 700 series GK110 with Kepler architecture.

The last driver where monitor type detection is working properly on Windows XP is 352.86.

See also 
 GeForce 400 series
 GeForce 500 series
 GeForce 600 series
 GeForce 800M series
 GeForce 900 series
 GeForce 10 series
 Nvidia Quadro
 Nvidia Tesla

Notes

References

External links

 GK110/GK210 Architecture Whitepaper
 GTX 750 Ti Whitepaper
 Introducing GeForce GTX TITAN Z: Ultimate Power
 Introducing the GeForce GTX TITAN
 Introducing The GeForce GTX 780 Ti: The Best Gaming GPU on the Planet
 Introducing The GeForce GTX 780
 Introducing The GeForce GTX 770
 Introducing The GeForce GTX 760: A Mid-Range GPU With High-End Features
 GeForce GTX 750 Class GPUs: Serious Gaming, Incredible Value
 Introducing Our New GeForce GTX 700M, Kepler-Powered Notebook GPUs
 GeForce GTX TITAN Z
 GeForce GTX TITAN BLACK
 GeForce GTX TITAN
 GeForce GTX 780 Ti
 GeForce GTX 780
 GeForce GTX 770
 GeForce GTX 760 Ti (OEM)
 GeForce GTX 760
 GeForce GTX 760 192-bit(OEM)
 GeForce GTX 750 Ti
 GeForce GTX 750
 GeForce GT 740

 GeForce GT 730
 GeForce GX 780M
 GeForce GX 770M
 GeForce GX 765M
 GeForce GX 760M
 GeForce GT 750M
 GeForce GT 745M
 GeForce GT 740M
 GeForce GT 735M
 GeForce GT 730M
 A New Dawn
 Nvidia Nsight
 TechPowerUp! GPU Database

Computer-related introductions in 2013
700 series
Graphics cards